Michael James Kidner  (11 September 1917 – 2009) was a pioneer of Op art in the mid-1960s from Kettering, Northamptonshire, England. Michael Kidner was one of its earliest and most consistent exponents and it was in these overlapping fields of optical effect and systemic structure that he was to find the creative substance that was to sustain his whole career. A Constructivist by inclination his interest in mathematics, chaos and wave theories informed an art that is both rational and intuitive. Without losing his rigorous, intellectual approach, Kidner manages to make his work resonate emotionally.Throughout his life he retained an interest in unpredictable world events that provoked unplanned elements within his work but he somehow managed to intimate an underlying order through his use of form and colour.

Early life 
Kidner was born in Kettering, the son of an industrialist and was one of 6 children. He was educated at Bedales progressive school and in 1939 he went to Cambridge to read History and Anthropology, before studying Landscape Architecture at Ohio state university. He was staying with his older sister and her American husband in the US when war broke out in Europe. Unable to return home he joined the Canadian army for 5 years. He was subsequently posted to England and after D Day saw active service in France in the Canadian Royal Corps of Signals. Post demobilisation in 1946, he enrolled at Goldsmiths University to study for a National Diploma in Art and Design. However he left after only 3 months as he was disenchanted with the course. From 1947 – 50, Kidner taught at Pitlochry Prep school in Perthshire and it was here that he started to paint as a hobby. In 1949 he met and married his wife Marion Frederick an American actress. From 1951 to 1952 he became a theatre designer in Bromley and Barnstaple whilst continuing to paint.
During a painting holiday in the south of France he met André Lhote who introduced him to Cubism and encouraged him to move to Paris and become a full-time painter. He travelled to Paris in 1953 where he attended Lhote's Atelier sporadically. After 2 years he returned to North Devon where his brother was practising as a GP. Here Kidner painted abstract landscapes rather in the spirit of the St Ives School. Subsequently, he moved to St Ives for several months where he became acquainted with Trevor Bell, Roger Hilton, Terry Frost, Patrick Heron, Peter Lanyon and others in the group.

On moving to London in 1957, Kidner was introduced to The New American Painting exhibition at the Tate Gallery where he saw the Abstract Expressionism of Jackson Pollock, and Willem de Kooning. Somewhat later Kidner was particularly influenced by Mark Rothko's Colour field paintings. These inspired his After Image paintings, sculptures and reliefs, executed between 1957 and 1962.
Another defining experience was a course in 1959 run by Victor Pasmore and Harry Thubron which alerted him to the Bauhaus derived ideas of colour. This led him towards a more objective use of colour that stimulated a new, radical approach to his painting.

Kidner's first solo exhibition was held at St Hilda's college, Oxford in 1959 where he showed his After Image paintings. However it was not until 1965 that he became recognised as a pioneer of Op Art following the publicity surrounding the exhibition called The Responsive Eye organised by William Seitz at the Museum of Modern Art in New York. Both Kidner and Bridget Riley's work were included.

Kidner was to teach at numerous art schools, including Bath Academy of Art and Chelsea College of Art. In 1978 he was invited by the artist Stass Paraskos to be an artist-in-residence at the Cyprus College of Art arts centre in Paphos on the island of Cyprus.

Mature career

After Image 1959 
Kidner said that "Optics presents a challenge that was once offered by perspective".
He was referring to the examination of visual perception in the science of linear perspective developed by Leon Battista Alberti and other Renaissance artists in the 15th century.
Kidner was also interested in the work of Seurat and the Neo Impressionists who had investigated the connection between the retina and the brain regarding colour perception, as seen in their Pointillist paintings. Rothko's Colour Field abstractions led Kidner to see colour as "pure sensation". For example, in his Moving Green 1959 the colours seem to float in an atmospheric colour relief in front of the canvas.On gazing at the colour field, the eye moves from the green to the red area and a bright, red spot or after image produced by the retina appears in the field.

Later Kidner's After Image works became hard edged with flat uniform patterns, when he realised that optical activity producing shimmer is decreased by brushy paintwork and varied shapes.

Stripe 1961 
However After Image became too limited for Kidner, he found that he wanted to approach colour in a more rational way, so he began a series of striped paintings using two alternating colours.

Moire 1963 
By 1963, Kidner had recognised the limitation of 2 colours, the problem of how to introduce a third colour was solved for him in an article on the Moire effect in the Scientific American. This effect was first discovered in Japanese silks, when the material was folded, optical patterns and colours floated above the actual patterns and colour of the material. This method produced a dramatic effect when Kidner crossed 2 colour bands with a third at a slight angle, resulting in a completely new pattern, with a wave like vertical image hovering into view producing an intense optical dazzle.

Wave 1969 
The appearance of the wave captivated Kidner and wave theory became his obsession as he realised that a wave pattern produces many more possibilities than straight lines because waves can be put in or out of phase.
As well as optical effects he was interested in distinguishing form from colour. He applied 3 colours to 4 forms in rotation so that no form could be identified by a particular colour. This can be seen in his print Sussex 1967

Columns 

In 1969 the notion of colour as form urged Kidner on to do a columnar sculpture of a wave. At this stage he became interested in Number theory as the key to "the nature of order" and "the structure of reality". Kidner was influenced by Lohse, a pioneer of systems art who had written that "Through its relation to structure, technology, science etc (The ) task is to set up systems".
Kidner meticulously translated the column into a two-dimensional form as a painting by using a systematic method of measurements and colour-coding as seen for example in:

Grids and lattices 1973 and stretched elastic, 1987 

At this stage Kidner began to be interested in the spaces between the lines and crisscross wavy lines began to emerge in his work, culminating in grids and lattices. These were sometimes in phase creating identical spaces in between and then sometimes out of phase so the spaces in between didn't repeat.

Kidner used this structure as a basis for creating many variations of this principle and observed that " the endless number of linear intersections both offer and resist any sort of visual resolution."

Continuing with his investigation of grids and lattices Kidner experimented with various materials. He stretched and distorted elastic cloth on moveable wooden frames in geometrical shapes, in order to arrive at unexpected shapes, thus introducing randomness, instability and change into his art. He felt that constructive art needed to take into account disorder as well as order.

Pentagon 1999 
By 1999, chaos theory became a profound influence on Kidner's work and geometric abstraction in the form of Penrose pentagons reprinted on paper became a critical tool as a metaphor for ordering the chaos in the world. This was Kidner's response to the many dystopian world events, such as global warming, wars, ethnic cleansing, terrorism and intense nationalism. Kidner was intrigued by the fact that his pentagon patterns looked chaotic, like whirlpools that appeared and receded as he viewed them. His use of colour in these works was often random and whereas in his former work, colour was used to clarify the grid, now it subverted it. He now invested more value in unplanned elements in his work of that time. He wondered if there may be in chaos "some kind of order that perhaps we haven't yet recognised."

In his last decade Kidner's work became more colourful and free. Titles such as Entangled Hyacinth Bulbs, 2007, Invasion of Iraq: Surprise Resistance 2007 and Particle Evolution: The End of the Tunnel at Cern.2008 indicate their subject matter.
Kidner's distinguished career has included many honours, prizes and international shows. He taught at Bath Academy of Art, Corsham from 1962 to 1982 and was visiting lecturer at The Slade School of Fine Art from 1975 – 9 and Chelsea School of Art from 1981 to 1985. He co–founded the Systems Group with artist Jeffrey Steele and others in 1969. His work is in many important collections including those of Tate Britain, The Royal Academy, The British Arts Council, provincial galleries as well as in Portugal, Germany, Poland, Hungary, Vienna, Tokyo Russia and America. In 2004 he was elected as a senior Royal Academician. He was taken on by Flowers East in 2004. Latterly he was to see a considerable revival of interest in his work, as general critical interest returned to the abstract painting of the 1960s and early 70s.

Death 
In spite of his progressive Cerebella Ataxia he continued to work in his studio with the help and support of the artist Adrian Richardson until a month before his death having been diagnosed with cancer. Kidner was predeceased by his wife Marion in 2004 and their son Simon was killed in a motorbike crash in 1980. He survived to see his last show of his 1960s working studies, Dreams of the World Order at the Royal Academy in September 2009.

Bibliography 
Exhibition Catalogues
Love is a Virus from Outer Space [Catalogue of the exhibition held at Flowers East 2003] London.
Michael Kidner: At-tension to the Wave [Catalogue of the exhibition held at Center for International Contemporary Arts, 1990] New York.
Micheal Kidner RA: Dreams of the World Order 1960s [Catalogue of the exhibition held at Flowers East 25 September – 9 December 2009] London.
Michael Kidner: No Goals in a Quicksand [Catalogue of the exhibition held at Flowers East 14 September – 13 October 2007] London.

References

External links 
michaelkidner.com
 
Flowers gallery
Guardian obituary for Michael Kidner
Independent obiturary for Michael Kidner
Telegraph obituary for Michael Kidner
sculpture.org.uk
Whitfordfineart.com
Tate gallery archives
Artnet

Modern artists
British abstract artists
British conceptual artists
People from Kettering
1917 births
2009 deaths
Op art
Royal Academicians